{{safesubst:#invoke:RfD|||month = March
|day = 20
|year = 2023
|time = 06:11
|timestamp = 20230320061139

|content=
REDIRECT Cafeteria Catholicism

}}